Ádám Kása (born 25 June 1984) is a Hungarian professional golfer. He was the highest ranked Hungarian amateur golfer in Hungary over the 2019 season on the European Golf Rankings.

Early life
Kása was born in Zalaegerszeg and was first introduced to golf at the age of 19 by his flatmate after coming across some disused clubs in a storage cellar. Prior to this Kása was a semi-professional Rugby League player.

Amateur career
Kása had a strong amateur career from 2015 to 2019. He competed in  regional, national and international events. His first amateur win came at the Tamworth Easter Vardon event in 2018.

Professional career
Kása turned professional in October 2019 and currently plays on the Swiss Pro Series and MENA Tour. He finished the 2021 season at a career high 1682nd place in the Official World Golf Ranking.

With a shortened season in 2020 due to the COVID-19 pandemic, Kása had mixed results with his best result being a tied 25th place at the Portiva Trophy Finalè on the Czech PGA.

2021 and 2022 have seen Kása playing a near full schedule after a disrupted 2020 season. Still without a professional win, 2022 has seen Kása have three Runner-up finishes, twice on the Stella Artois Swiss Pro Series and once on the PGA of Poland. He finished 13th on the Order of Merit for the 2022 season.

After an impressive off-season, the start of the 2022 season delivered Kása's career-low 54 hole score on the Toro Tour in Spain. Kása had scores of 69-69-70 (−5) to finish tied 17th in only his second start of the year.

References

External links

Hungarian male golfers
1984 births
Living people